Isabelle McCalla (born June 15, 1993) is an American actress and singer. She is best known for playing Alyssa Greene in the Broadway musical The Prom and playing Jasmine in the Broadway musical version of Disney's Aladdin.

Early life and education 
McCalla was born in Queens and grew up in Suffern, New York. She has a younger brother named Colin.

McCalla attended Rockland Country Day School. She studied dance at Coupé Theater Studio from a young age. McCalla was enrolled in ballet class in third grade to learn discipline, and she took more classes as she entered high school.

She attended the University of Michigan and graduated in 2015.

Career 
McCalla made her Broadway debut in January 2018, as Jasmine in Disney's Aladdin. She had previously originated the role in the first national tour.

Later in 2018, McCalla originated the role of Alyssa Greene in The Prom on Broadway. She had previously performed as an ensemble member in the show's Atlanta premiere in 2016.<ref>{{cite web|last=Moynihan|first=Caitlin|date=2019-07-10|title=The Prom'''s Isabelle McCalla on 'Choosing Joy,' Bringing Miss Congeniality to Broadway & More|url=https://www.broadway.com/buzz/196345/the-proms-isabelle-mccalla-on-choosing-joy-bringing-miss-congeniality-to-broadway-more/|url-status=live|access-date=2020-12-17|website=Broadway.com}}</ref> McCalla and co-star Caitlin Kinnunen's kiss during their performance at the 2018 Macy’s Thanksgiving Day Parade made national news as the first LGBT kiss in the parade's history.

McCalla appeared across the US performing beloved songs as part of the Disney Princess — The Concert tour.

 Personal life 
McCalla's father is from Haiti.

In 2019, McCalla came out as queer and bisexual on the Thank You For Coming Out'' podcast.

Filmography

Film

Television

Web

Stage credits

Awards and nominations

References

External links 
 IMDB
 Internet Broadway Database
 Instagram

1993 births
21st-century American actresses
21st-century American singers
21st-century American women singers
American musical theatre actresses
African-American actresses
21st-century African-American women singers
Living people
Bisexual women
Bisexual actresses
Queer women
Queer actors
University of Michigan alumni
People from Queens, New York
Actresses from New York City
Singers from New York City
American bisexual actors